Chiyatau (Seyätaw) is a rural locality (a village) in Tuchubayevsky Selsoviet, Baltachevsky District, Bashkortostan, Russia. The population was 5 as of 2010. There is 1 street.

Geography 
Chiyatau is located 67 km west of Starobaltachevo (the district's administrative centre) by road.

References 

Rural localities in Baltachevsky District